Bryn railway station served the village of Bryn, Neath Port Talbot, Wales, from 1898 to 1964 on the Port Talbot Railway.

History 
The station was opened on 14 February 1898 by the Port Talbot Railway and Docks Company. It closed to passengers on 11 September 1933 and closed to goods on 31 August 1964.

References 

Disused railway stations in Neath Port Talbot
Railway stations in Great Britain opened in 1898
Railway stations in Great Britain closed in 1933
1898 establishments in Wales
1964 disestablishments in Wales